Buridda, officially known as LSOA Buridda (Laboratorio Sociale Occupato Autogestito – Occupied self-managed social laboratory),  is a squatted self-managed social centre in the city of Genoa, Italy. It was established in 2003 and has changed location several times since inception, due to its uncertain legal status. The centre is wholly run and organized by volunteers and funds itself through donations and fundraising. It offers various services and activities to the community, including open space for exercise, circus-related facilities and skills training, art spaces and workshops, wood and metalworking shops with tools and machinery, 3D printers, communal kitchen, and an amateur radio station.

History

Early days
The idea for the formation of an occupied social centre in Genoa arose in part due to opposition to the Second Gulf War and the ensuing conflict in the Middle East, as well as discontent shared by some segments of the Genoese community since the 2001 G8 meeting in the city, which led to violent confrontations and several deaths. Themes surrounding the concept included anti-capitalism, negative effects of globalization, opposition to war, a desire for sustainable development, community-building, the need for more social spaces, as well as a desire for improved living standards for the underprivileged, including migrants and refugees. Those involved in organizing the ensuing occupations and the eventual social centre included members of the Communist Refoundation Party, environmental activists, anarchist and pacifist adherents, as well as students.

At the start of the 2003 invasion of Iraq by the US-led coalition, a grassroots group of activists occupied a building in Via Milano for one week as a form of protest. This shared experience strengthened the collective and helped them solidify their goals, one of which was the desire for a permanent physical location to organize activities and present an alternative for community gatherings.

The former Faculty of Economics at Via Bertani 1 was occupied on the morning of 11 May 2003. The building, owned by the University of Genoa, had been empty and in a state of neglect for several years. Inside, the occupants found thousands of books, which the university was compelled to remove after a few days. Some weeks after the occupation began, the name Buridda was chosen to represent the newly formed organization. The name is a reference to the typical Ligurian seafood soup and alludes to the diversity of the components participating in the occupation.

Via Bertani
The first project put into practice at Buridda was the creation of a ham radio station. This was done in a few weeks, and it was given the name Radio Babylon. Limited broadcasts began on the FM frequency, covering a small radius around the occupied building.
After less than two months from the time it began to transmit, however, the station was raided by the Polizia Postale, a branch of the Italian State Police, who seized all radio equipment, claiming that the transmissions created interference on Savona fire brigade frequencies.

Despite this setback, Buridda remained active. The collective opened up the space they occupied to anyone in the city wishing to hold social, cultural, or other group projects. In a short time, the building filled up with people and activities, and within a few years, it became a point of reference in the counter-cultural sphere of Genoa. Buridda was used for various activities including theatre, craft workshops, study groups, music rehearsals and recording, computer labs, musical events, as well as the first Fab lab in Italy. The site established its own recording studio, concert space, boxing gym, and climbing gym, among others.
The social centre was regularly used for concerts and cultural events including Critical Wine, an annual fair for small-scale wine producers held in different parts of the country each year.

Eviction and new space
The official status of the occupied building out of which Buridda was based has always been disputed and mired in controversy. Initially owned by the University of Genoa, it was eventually purchased by Giuseppe Pericu shortly before his term as mayor of Genoa ended.
On 4 June 2014, the police raided the squat at Via Bertani 1 and evicted all its occupants. This proved to be an unpopular move on the part of the city, and an outpouring of online support was seen immediately following the drastic police action.
Within a few weeks, the Buridda collective had found a new space to occupy at Corso Montegrappa 39.
On 7 June, they temporarily occupied Garaventa, an abandoned elementary school in the historic centre of the city. Following this, the group planned a large rally for 14 June. The event took place as planned, and an estimated 2,000 people took part in the procession. The municipal police, under the impression that the squatters would try to reoccupy Via Bertani 1, kept the building under armed guard. The procession, however, was headed for Corso Montegrappa; once they reached it, they triumphantly entered their new residence, the former Magisterium of Genoa, inaugurated by Benito Mussolini in 1937, and owned by the University of Genoa. As of March 2022, Buridda is still located at this address.

Sale threats
In 2016, the University of Genoa notified the residents of Buridda that they would be switching off power to the building and selling the property after 15 years of disuse. In March of that year, they followed through on that threat and the power was turned off. The collective was forced to improvise with self-organized renewable energy sources in order to power the building again.
In August 2016, the university listed the building for auction at a starting price of almost €3 million. As of March 2020, the building has been listed for auction three times but remains unsold. During the first listing, a rumour circulated about a possible offer from the Church of Jesus Christ of Latter-day Saints.

Selected initiatives & projects
Radio GrAMma
Buridda operates a pirate AM radio station called Radio GrAMma.

FabLab

Open gym

See also
 CSOA Forte Prenestino
 Cascina Torchiera
 Bussana Vecchia

References

Further reading
 Social centres and the struggle for a different model of legalisation
 In the Shell of the Old - Italy's Social Centres

External links
 Official website

Social centres
Squats in Italy
2003 establishments in Italy
Buildings and structures in Genoa
Music venues in Italy